The Simon May Collection is a 2010 compilation album of television and film music written by Simon May.

The album was released to coincide with the departure of the character Peggy Mitchell, played by Barbara Windsor, from the BBC soap opera EastEnders. May, who composed the original EastEnders theme in 1984, was commissioned to rework "Julia's Theme", a slow, piano version of the main theme traditionally used at "the end of episodes featuring intense emotion or drama". The track, "Peggy's Theme", was made available to download following the broadcast of the character's departure.

May appeared playing numbers from the collection in a concert at the Corn Exchange in Devizes on 22 September 2010.

Track listing
"Peggy's Theme" (variation of "Julia's Theme" from EastEnders) performed by Simon May
"Always There" (from Howards' Way) performed by Susie Webb & The Simon May Orchestra
"More to Life" (from BBC TV series Trainer) performed by Cliff Richard
"Holiday Suite" (from BBC TV Holiday '86) performed by the Simon May Orchestra
"I'm Drowning" performed by James Keogh
"Summer of My Life" performed by Simon May (2010 version duet with Rosie May)
"Eldorado" (theme from BBC TV series Eldorado) performed by the Simon May Orchestra
"Howards' Way Theme" performed by the Simon May Orchestra
"One More Chance" performed by Jack Duxbury
"The Dawning Suite" (1st Movement) performed by The Simon May Orchestra
"Every Loser Wins" performed by Nick Berry
"All of Me" performed by Charley Rouse
"Barracuda" (from Howards' Way) performed by the Simon May Orchestra
"Abbey's Theme" (from Howards' Way) performed by the Simon May Orchestra
"Frere" (from Howards' Way) performed by the Simon May Orchestra
"Wolfgang" performed by Simon May
"Anyone Can Fall in Love" performed by Anita Dobson & The Simon May Orchestra
"By the River" performed by James Keogh
"Parents"/"Better Off The Way I Am" (from the musical Smike) performed by Matthew Padden & The Simon May Orchestra
"I'll See You Again" (School Leavers' Song) performed by the Simon May Orchestra & Choirs
"EastEnders Theme" (new BBC TV version 2009) performed by the Simon May Orchestra
"Glory Be (To God on High)" (EastEnders Hymn) performed by the Simon May Orchestra & Choirs
"Bless This Moment" performed by Susie Webb

See also
 New Vintage: The Best of Simon May — a 1994 compilation album.

References

External links
The Simon May Collection at Music on Screen
Peggy's Theme Official site

2010 compilation albums